Yasuda is a Japanese surname.

Yasuda may also refer to:

Sushi Yasuda, a sushi restaurant in New York City
Yasuda, Kōchi, a town located in Aki District, Kochi, Japan
Yasuda Bank, a part of the Yasuda zaibatsu, later known as Fuji Bank
Yasuda clan, a samurai/business family that arose during the Sengoku period
Yasuda Dai Circus, a Japanese comedy trio
Yasuda Fire and Marine Insurance Company, a part of the Yasuda zaibatsu, later merged into Sompo Japan Insurance
Yasuda Kinen,  a Japanese horse race held in Tokyo
Yasuda Mutual Life Insurance Company, a part of the Yasuda zaibatsu, later merged into Meiji Yasuda Life Insurance
Yasuda Station (disambiguation), two train stations in Japan
Yasuda Women's University in Hiroshima
Yasuda zaibatsu, a financial conglomerate owned and managed by the Yasuda family
9230 Yasuda, an asteroid